St. Barbara's in Chicago - historic church of the Roman Catholic Archdiocese of Chicago located in Chicago, Illinois, at 2859 South Throop St.

It is a prime example of the Polish Cathedral style of churches in both its opulence and grand scale.  Along with St. Mary of Perpetual Help, it is one of two monumental religious edifices that dominate the Bridgeport neighborhood's skyline.

History
Founded in 1909 as a Polish parish to relieve overcrowding at St. Mary of Perpetual Help.  Reverend Anthony Nawrocki, brother of St. Mary's pastor Stanislaus Nawrocki was the first pastor, thus the founding of the parish was a family affair in both the literal and figurative sense. In 2016, rumors began circulating surrounding the impending "Renew My Church" program. Rumors became reality in 2019 when the Archdiocese decided to "merge" St. Barbara with St. Therese Chinese Catholic School. However, unlike other "merge" plans in Renew My Church, St. Therese assumed possession of St. Barbara's school campus, administration, and rectory quarters.

Architecture
The church was designed by the firm of Worthmann and Steinbach who built many of the magnificent Polish Cathedrals in Chicago.  The Renaissance style edifice was completed in 1914, it is one of the few octagonal houses of worship in the archdiocese.  There are 25 stunning stained glass windows, depicting the Gospel, and the lives of the saints.

Church in architecture books

See also
Polish Cathedral style churches of Chicago
Polish Americans
Poles in Chicago
Roman Catholicism in Poland

External links 
 PGSA - St. Barbara Church History
 Archdiocese of Chicago
 http://www.myschoolpages.com/schools/stbarbaraelementary/about.cfm
 http://stbarbarachicago.org/

Bridgeport, Chicago
Roman Catholic churches in Chicago
Polish-American culture in Chicago
Polish Cathedral style architecture
Christian organizations established in 1909